Gerry Stoker (born 4 February 1955), is a British political scientist noted for his works on local government and his textbooks. He is also a lecturer at the University of Southampton.

Biography

Stoker has provided advice to various parts of UK government and is also an expert advisor to the Council of Europe on local government and participation issues. More broadly he has, over the past five years, received invitations to speak at conferences on governance issues aimed at practitioners and policymakers as well as academics from the USA, Japan, China, Italy, Korea Norway, Ireland, Germany, Spain, Portugal, Denmark and Australia. In particular, he was a keynote speaker at the United Nation's 6th Reinventing Government Global Forum, Korea in 2005. In 2004, he won the Political Studies Association Award for 'making a difference' in recognition of the impact of his work on governance issues.
	
Gerry Stoker is Professor of Politics and Governance at the University of Southampton, UK.  He has authored or edited over 20 books and published over 70 refereed articles or chapters in books. His work has been translated into French, Spanish, Italian, Polish, Hebrew, Portuguese and Chinese. His most recent book Why Politics Matters won the 2006 political book of the year award from the Political Studies Association of the UK.

His current research deals with issues of governance in complex settings, political disenchantment in western democracies, citizen empowerment and strategies for encouraging civic behaviour among citizens. In his research work Professor Stoker is committed to the use of pioneering methods and in particular to approaches that enable evidenced-based policy and practice. In recent work he has promoted the use of randomized control trials, design experiments and Boolean techniques to draw out lessons from multiple case studies.  Professor Stoker was the founding Chair of the New Local Government Network (www.nlgn.org.uk) that was the think tank of the year in the UK in 2004.

He has acted as an advisor to the UK government and the Council of Europe on local government issues over the last decade and more.

Selected bibliography

Books

Forthcoming

References

External links 
 Profile page: Gerry Stoker Social Sciences: Politics & International Relations, University of Southampton

1955 births
Living people
British political scientists